

Crown
Head of State - Queen Elizabeth II

Federal government
Governor General - Jeanne Sauvé

Cabinet
Prime Minister -  Brian Mulroney
Deputy Prime Minister - Don Mazankowski
Minister of Finance - Michael Wilson
Secretary of State for External Affairs - Joe Clark
Secretary of State for Canada - Lucien Bouchard then Gerry Weiner
Minister of National Defence - Perrin Beatty then Bill McKnight
Minister of National Health and Welfare - Jake Epp then Perrin Beatty
Minister of Regional Industrial Expansion - Robert de Cotret then Harvie André
Minister of the Environment - Lucien Bouchard
Minister of Justice - Joe Clark (acting) then Doug Lewis
Minister of Transport - Benoît Bouchard
Minister of Communications - Lowell Murray (acting) then Marcel Masse
Minister of Fisheries and Oceans - Tom Siddon
Minister of Agriculture - Don Mazankowski
Minister of Public Works - Otto Jelinek then Elmer MacKay
Minister of Employment and Immigration - Barbara McDougall
Minister of Indian Affairs and Northern Development - Bill McKnight then Pierre Cadieux
Minister of Energy, Mines and Resources - Marcel Masse then Jake Epp
Minister of Veterans Affairs - Gerald Merrithew

Parliament
See: 34th Canadian parliament

Party leaders
Progressive Conservative Party of Canada -  Brian Mulroney
Liberal Party of Canada - John Turner
New Democratic Party- Ed Broadbent then Audrey McLaughlin
Reform Party of Canada - Preston Manning

Supreme Court Justices
Chief Justice: Brian Dickson
William McIntyre then Beverley McLachlin
Bertha Wilson
Antonio Lamer
Gérard V. La Forest
John Sopinka
Jean Beetz then Peter deCarteret Cory
Claire L'Heureux-Dubé
Gerald Eric Le Dain then Charles D. Gonthier

Other
Speaker of the House of Commons - John Allen Fraser
Governor of the Bank of Canada - John Crow
Chief of the Defence Staff - General P.D. Manson then General John de Chastelain

Provinces

Premiers
Premier of Alberta - Don Getty
Premier of British Columbia - Bill Vander Zalm
Premier of Manitoba - Gary Filmon
Premier of New Brunswick - Frank McKenna
Premier of Newfoundland - Brian Peckford then Thomas Rideout then Clyde Wells
Premier of Nova Scotia - John Buchanan
Premier of Ontario - David Peterson
Premier of Prince Edward Island - Joe Ghiz
Premier of Quebec - Robert Bourassa
Premier of Saskatchewan - Grant Devine
Premier of the Northwest Territories - Dennis Patterson
Premier of Yukon - Tony Penikett

Lieutenant-governors
Lieutenant-Governor of Alberta - Helen Hunley
Lieutenant-Governor of British Columbia - David Lam
Lieutenant-Governor of Manitoba - George Johnson
Lieutenant-Governor of New Brunswick - Gilbert Finn
Lieutenant-Governor of Newfoundland and Labrador - James Aloysius McGrath
Lieutenant-Governor of Nova Scotia -Alan Abraham then Lloyd Roseville Crouse
Lieutenant-Governor of Ontario - Lincoln Alexander
Lieutenant-Governor of Prince Edward Island - Robert Lloyd George MacPhail
Lieutenant-Governor of Quebec - Gilles Lamontagne
Lieutenant-Governor of Saskatchewan - Sylvia Fedoruk

Mayors
Toronto - Art Eggleton
Montreal - Jean Doré
Vancouver - Gordon Campbell
Ottawa - James A. Durrell

Religious leaders
Roman Catholic Bishop of Quebec - Cardinal Archbishop Louis-Albert Vachon
Roman Catholic Bishop of Montreal -  Cardinal Archbishop Paul Grégoire
Roman Catholic Bishops of London - Bishop John Michael Sherlock
Moderator of the United Church of Canada - Sang Chul Lee

See also
1988 Canadian incumbents
Events in Canada in 1989
1990 Canadian incumbents
 Governmental leaders in 1989
Canadian incumbents by year

1989
Incumbents
Canadian leaders